Artyom Ternavsky (born June 2, 1983) is a Russian professional ice hockey defenceman who currently plays for Avtomobilist Yekaterinburg of the Kontinental Hockey League (KHL). He was selected by the Washington Capitals in the 5th round (160th overall) of the 2001 NHL Entry Draft.

Career statistics

Regular season and playoffs

International

References

External links

Living people
HC Vityaz players
1983 births
Admiral Vladivostok players
Washington Capitals draft picks
Torpedo Nizhny Novgorod players
Zauralie Kurgan players
Russian ice hockey defencemen
People from Magnitogorsk
Sportspeople from Chelyabinsk Oblast